Jan Černohorský (1898–1976) was a Czech fencer. He competed at the 1920 and 1928 Summer Olympics.

References

1898 births
1976 deaths
Czech male fencers
Czechoslovak male fencers
Olympic fencers of Czechoslovakia
Fencers at the 1920 Summer Olympics
Fencers at the 1928 Summer Olympics